Jovo Bećir (14 September 1870 – 1942) was a Montenegrin brigadier general and a colonel of the Royal Yugoslav Army.

Biography
Bećir was a brigadier general in the Royal Montenegrin Army during the Montenegrin Campaign of World War I. On 25 January 1916, he was one of the signatories of the Montenegrin capitulation after the Battle of Mojkovac.

He was a colonel in the Army of the Kingdom of Yugoslavia in the interwar period. Although retired, he was activated at the beginning of the Invasion of Yugoslavia in 1941. After the defeat of the Yugoslav forces, he was captured and then released due to the intervention of Queen Jelena, but after he rejected to take part in the Italian governorate of Montenegro, he was again captured in late 1941 by Croatian fascist units known as the Ustaše and taken to Jasenovac concentration camp where he was killed in 1942.

References

External links 

1870 births
1942 deaths
Military personnel from Cetinje
Serbs of Montenegro
People of the Principality of Montenegro
People of the Kingdom of Montenegro
19th-century Montenegrin people
20th-century Montenegrin people
Montenegrin soldiers
Montenegrin military personnel of the Balkan Wars
Montenegrin military personnel of World War I
World War I prisoners of war held by Austria-Hungary
Royal Yugoslav Army personnel
Royal Yugoslav Army personnel of World War II
People who died in Jasenovac concentration camp
People executed by the Independent State of Croatia
Yugoslav military personnel killed in World War II
Yugoslav people executed in Nazi concentration camps